Tomáš Belic (born 2 July 1978) is a Slovak footballer who plays for AFC Nové Mesto nad Váhom. His former club was Spartak Myjava in the Fortuna Liga.

Club career
Belic previously played for Panionios F.C., 1. FC Brno and FK Teplice in the Czech Gambrinus liga. He has also played for FC Spartak Trnava and FK AS Trenčín in the Slovak Superliga.

He signed a two-and-one-half-year contract with Panionios on 22 December 2008.

Coaching career
Belic started as a youth goalkeeper coach at Trenčín. He was promoted to the first team goalkeeper coach in July 2018 under manager Ricardo Moniz.

References

External links 
 
 Guardian Football

1978 births
Living people
Sportspeople from Trenčín
Slovak footballers
Association football goalkeepers
FK Dubnica players
MŠK Žilina players
AS Trenčín players
FC Spartak Trnava players
FC Zbrojovka Brno players
SK Dynamo České Budějovice players
MFK Vítkovice players
FK Teplice players
Panionios F.C. players
MŠK Púchov players
FK Dukla Banská Bystrica players
FC DAC 1904 Dunajská Streda players
Spartak Myjava players
Slovak Super Liga players
Czech First League players
Super League Greece players
Slovak expatriate footballers
Expatriate footballers in the Czech Republic
Expatriate footballers in Greece
Slovak expatriate sportspeople in the Czech Republic
Slovak expatriate sportspeople in Greece